Cross Timbers Park is a park located in North Richland Hills, Texas. The park claims  of land. Included in the park are playgrounds, walking trails and a youth baseball complex with three lighted fields and a practice field.  In 2007 the baseball complex acted as the home field for the Tarrant County Blue Thunder of the Continental Baseball League.

External links
Official park info

Baseball venues in Texas
North Richland Hills, Texas